Guy Vernon Moon is an American composer.

Biography
Moon was born and grew up in Fort Atkinson, Wisconsin, and attended the University of Arizona in 1980. He moved to California in 1986.

Inspired by the musical works of Chick Corea, Moon has written music for film and animated television series, such as 2 Stupid Dogs, Johnny Bravo, Cow and Chicken, The Grim Adventures of Billy & Mandy (Grim & Evil segments only), The Fairly OddParents (for which he received an Emmy nomination), Danny Phantom, Tak and the Power of Juju (theme music and three episodes only), Big Time Rush, T.U.F.F. Puppy, and Back at the Barnyard. He is also credited with composing and orchestrating the music for The Real Adventures of Jonny Quest animation series produced by Cartoon Network, as well as the resumption of Johnny Test.

Moon currently resides in San Fernando Valley, Los Angeles, California.

Filmography

Film

Television

References

External links

1962 births
Living people
People from Fort Atkinson, Wisconsin
University of Arizona alumni
American film score composers
American television composers
Animation composers
Musicians from Wisconsin
American electronic musicians
American house musicians
American rock musicians